Shawn William Bates (born April 3, 1975 in Medford, Massachusetts) is an American former professional ice hockey center. He played in the National Hockey League for the Boston Bruins and New York Islanders.

Playing career

College 
Bates played four seasons with the Boston University Terriers. In his four years he helped lead the team to the Frozen Four each year. Bates' teams appeared in two NCAA Finals and won the NCAA Championship in 1995, Bates was named to the All Tournament team. Overall, Bates compiled 73 goals, 71 assists, 144 points, and 190 penalty minutes in a total of 160 games.

NHL 
Bates was drafted by the Boston Bruins in the 1993 NHL Entry Draft, 4th Round, 103rd Overall. After four years with the Bruins, he was signed as a free agent by the Islanders on July 7, 2001. Bates is remembered most for scoring on a penalty shot in Game 4 of the Islanders' Eastern Conference Quarterfinal playoff series against the Toronto Maple Leafs. Bates beat Maple Leaf goaltender Curtis Joseph top shelf to give the Islanders a 4–3 lead with 2:30 to go in regulation, and the Islanders went on to win the game and tied the series 2–2. The penalty shot was the third playoff Penalty Shot in Islander history and the first to be successful. After injuries limited Bates to two games in 2007-08, he was placed on waivers by the Islanders on June 27, 2008 and ultimately had his contract bought out.

In the 2002–03 NHL season, Bates led the NHL with six short-handed goals.

SM-liiga 
In November 2008, after almost a full season without playing, Shawn Bates debuted in Finnish SM-liiga when he played for HIFK in a regular season matchup against TPS. HIFK lost the game but Bates scored one goal and 3 assists in his debut, which attracted praise from his Head Coach Kari Jalonen.

International play 
Bates played for Team USA in the 1995 World Juniors, recording six points (5–1–6) in seven games.

Ceremonial 

Threw out the ceremonial first pitch at the Championship Game of the Medford, MA Little League City Series in June 1993.  The game between the Angels and Bears was eventually won by the Angels 5-4 with a walk-off home run by catcher Joe Bradanese

Awards and honors

Career statistics

Regular season and playoffs

International

References

External links
 

1975 births
Living people
American men's ice hockey centers
Boston Bruins draft picks
Boston Bruins players
Boston University Terriers men's ice hockey players
HIFK (ice hockey) players
EC KAC players
Manchester Monarchs (AHL) players
New York Islanders players
Sportspeople from Medford, Massachusetts
Providence Bruins players
Ice hockey players from Massachusetts
NCAA men's ice hockey national champions